Pink International Company is a Serbian mass media company headquartered in Belgrade.

The company is owned by Pink Media Group, and operates with: Pink TV (one of the leading commercial television stations in Serbia); Radio Pink (a successful radio station covering Belgrade); Fashion TV Southeast Europe, Fashion TV SEE or FTV SEE (regional channel franchise from Fashion TV International); and, PFI Studios (international film production studios).

History
Registered as a limited liability company, Pink International Company is owned by Serbian businessman and entrepreneur Željko Mitrović who amassed his fortune during the 1990s under the regime of Slobodan Milošević. Mitrović was a close personal friend of Milošević's wife Mira Marković and an influential official of her Yugoslav Left (JUL) party.

Mitrović founded Pink International Company in the 1990s following the formation of the radio activities and later expansion into television. The company was re-registered on 25 April 2005, in accordance with new Serbian laws and regulations.

In June 2018, Pink International Company sold to "Direct Media" its Montenegrin and Bosnian divisions – Pink M and Pink BH, respectively.

Activities
Pink International's range of activities encompass:

Radio
Radio Pink was started in 1993, covering only the Belgrade metropolitan area. The premise behind the radio was to focus on music programming. No news is broadcast.

Television
Pink TV is the leading commercial television station in Serbia. Founded in 1994 and covering initially only the Belgrade area, the station later achieved countrywide reach by the late 1990s. In 1998, Pink TV achieved the leading position in the market. Pink TV's emphasis is on light entertainment programming: movies, sitcoms, music variety shows, talk shows, reality shows and news.

Satellite Television
Pink International provides production content for two global satellite channels (Pink Extra and Pink Plus) broadcast to subscribers in Europe, Australia and North America. There are nine direct-to-home (DTH) satellite channels that have been created in cooperation with Serbia's largest cable company, Serbia Broadband (SBB) although some content from Pink Extra and/or Pink Plus is available on the DTH channels. Pink International provides content for these satellite channels from its own production (TV Pink) and well as content purchased from or co-produced with independent production companies.

Fashion TV Southeast Europe
In November 2008, Pink International launched Fashion TV Southeast Europe (Fashion TV SEE or FTV SEE).  Pink International obtained the franchise rights, from Fashion TV International, for Bosnia and Herzegovina, Croatia, Macedonia, Montenegro, Serbia and Slovenia.  This regional satellite channel is distributed through cable and DTH.  Michel Adam Lisowski, the owner of Fashion TV International, attended the launch activities with senior Pink representatives including Zeljko Mitrovic in Belgrade, Ljubljana and Zagreb.  Fashion TV SEE has a potential market reach of more than 20 million viewers.

Film Production
PFI Studios (opened in 2007), a division of Pink International, consists currently of eight sound stages that have been designed and built to attract international productions, primarily American and West European. A ninth sound stage, planned for completion in 2011, will be one of the largest in Europe. In addition to the sound stages, the studio complex consists of administrative office buildings, warehouses and a back lot (12.5 hectares), all located in Šimanovci just 15 minutes outside of Belgrade. PFI Studios provides full production support in addition to studio infrastructure to international film projects. To date, productions such as Lockout and The Raven have been shot there.

PFI Studios has also co-produced Serbian films that have achieved local box office acclaim: Promeni me (Change Me), Četvrti čovek (The Fourth Man), Čitulja za Eskobara (Obituary for Escobar), and Zona mrtvih (Zone of the Dead).

Channels

TV

Terrestrial
Pink TV – Serbia

Satellite and cable

Pink Plus – Based in Vienna, Austria
Pink BH – Based in Sarajevo, Bosnia and Herzegovina
Pink M – Based in Podgorica, Montenegro
Pink Extra – Broadcasts programs from Pink BH
RED TV
VESTI TV 
INSTA TV
Pink Premium – Broadcasts foreign movies
Pink Movies – Broadcasts foreign action movies
Pink Romance – Broadcasts foreign romance movies
Pink Sci-Fi & Fantasy – Broadcasts foreign sci-fi movies
Pink Action – Broadcasts foreign action movies
Pink Thriller – Broadcasts foreign thriller movies
Pink Crime & Mystery
Pink Classic – Broadcasts foreign classic movies
Pink Western – Broadcasts foreign western movies
Pink Horror – Broadcasts foreign horror movies
Pink Comedy – Broadcasts foreign comedy movies
Pink World Cinema – Broadcasts foreign movies
Pink Film – Broadcasts domestic movies
Pink Family – Broadcasts foreign series
Pink Soap
Pink Serije – Broadcasts domestic series
Pink Koncert
Pink Hits
Pink Hits 2
Pink N Roll
Pink Music
Pink Music 2
Pink Folk
Pink Folk 2
Pink Show
City Play
Bravo Music
Pink Pedia
Pink Fashion
Pink Style
Pink Kuvar
Pink Super Kids
Pink Kids
Pink Zabava
Pink World
Erotic
Erotic 2
Erotic 3
Erotic 4
Erotic 5
Erotic 6
Erotic 7
Erotic 8
Pink Reality

Radio
Radio Pink – Able to be heard all over the world via satellite and internet
Red Radio
WTF Radio

Film Production
PFI Studios

Former assets
 Pink M (2002–2018)
 Pink BH (2003–2018) 
 Pink 15 (2010–2012)
 Pink Si (2010–2012)

References

Companies based in Belgrade
D.o.o. companies in Serbia
Film production companies of Serbia
Mass media companies of Serbia
Serbian companies established in 1998
Mass media companies established in 1998